Chamhad is one of the 51 Union Councils (subdivisions) of Abbottabad District in the Khyber Pakhtunkhwa province of Pakistan.

Location 

Chamad is located at 34°7'0N 73°4'60E, in the west of the district where it forms part of Abbottabad's border with Haripur District. It has an average elevation of 870 metres (2857 feet).
Neighbouring settlements include Patian, Baghdara and Talhad and Sarbangala

Subdivisions
 Bagh Darah
 Beram Gali
 Bisala
 Chamak Mera
 Chamhad
 Fateh Bandi
 Khani That Hiara
 Sar Bangala
 Shadial

References

 Khorian, Batangi, Mangal Darra, Sarbangala, Barangalli, Beesala, Bucha Galli,

Union councils of Abbottabad District